Miro Katić (born 2 February 1974) is a Bosnian-Herzegovinian retired footballer.

Club career
Katić previously played for NK Međimurje in the Croatian Prva HNL.

International career
He made his debut for Bosnia and Herzegovina in an April 2002 friendly match against Croatia, coming on as a second haf substitute for Sergej Barbarez. It remained his sole international appearance.

References

External links
 
 
 Croatian Cup data at hrnogomet

1974 births
Living people
Footballers from Split, Croatia
Association football midfielders
Bosnia and Herzegovina footballers
Bosnia and Herzegovina international footballers
GNK Dinamo Zagreb players
HNK Šibenik players
NK Osijek players
NK Hrvatski Dragovoljac players
NK Brotnjo players
NK Široki Brijeg players
FC Moscow players
NK Međimurje players
HŠK Posušje players
NK Solin players
RNK Split players
Croatian Football League players
Premier League of Bosnia and Herzegovina players
Russian Premier League players
First Football League (Croatia) players
Bosnia and Herzegovina expatriate footballers
Expatriate footballers in Croatia
Bosnia and Herzegovina expatriate sportspeople in Croatia
Expatriate footballers in Russia
Bosnia and Herzegovina expatriate sportspeople in Russia